The Gonow Xingwang (星旺) or Gonow Way is a Microvan produced by China’s Gonow Automobile, a subsidiary of the Guangzhou Automobile.

Overview

The Gonow Way made its debut on the Chinese market in August 2012, with the prices ranging from 25,900 yuan to 29,800 yuan. Engines available includes a 1.0L producing 60hp (44kW) at 5600rpm and a torque of 85N·m mated to a 5-speed manual gearbox.

Gonow Way L
The Gonow Xingwang L or Gonow Way L is the long wheelbase version of the regular Gonow Way, the length is 180mm longer and the wheelbase is 100mm longer. Prices of the Gonow Xingwang L ranges from 32,900 yuan to 34,800 yuan.

Gonow Way CL
The Gonow Xingwang CL or Gonow Way CL is the longer and more premium version of the Gonow Way L, the length is 360mm longer and the wheelbase is 185mm longer than the Gonow Way. Prices of the Gonow Xingwang CL ranges from 36,800 yuan to 45,800 yuan.

Gonow Way M1

The Gonow Xingwang M1 or Gonow Way M1 is the 2-door pickup version of the regular Gonow Way with the prices ranging from 29,900 yuan to 31,800 yuan.

Gonow Way M2
The Gonow Xingwang M2 or Gonow Way M2 is the 4-door pickup version of the regular Gonow Way with the prices ranging from 30,900 yuan to 32,800 yuan.

New Gonow EM10 and Dongfeng Ruitaite EM10

The New Gonow EM10 and Dongfeng Ruitaite EM10 (瑞泰特 EM10) are rebadged electric panel vans based on the Gonow Way CL by Dongfeng. The Ruitaite EM10 utilizes the vehicle body of the Way CL panel van with little to no further modifications besides the sealed up front grille with the Dongfeng logo and the tailgate still features the stamped Gonow text. The Ruitaite EM10 is powered by an electric motor producing 61hp and 205N·m. There are three range variants, the 215km, 255km and 278km variants all have the same top speed of 85km/h. The 255km variant is equipped with a 41.4kWh battery while the 278km variant is equipped with a 40.86kWh one.

See also
 List of GAC vehicles

References

External links

 
 
 

Way
Vans
Pickup trucks
Microvans
Vehicles introduced in 2013
Rear-wheel-drive vehicles
Cars of China
Production electric cars